NGC 1259 is a lenticular galaxy located about 243 million light-years away in the constellation Perseus. The galaxy was discovered by astronomer Guillaume Bigourdan on October 21, 1884 and is a member of the Perseus Cluster.

A type Ia supernova designated as SN 2008L was discovered in NGC 1259 on January 14, 2008.

See also 
 List of NGC objects (1001–2000)
 NGC 1260

References

External links
 

Perseus Cluster
Perseus (constellation)
Lenticular galaxies
1259
12208 
Astronomical objects discovered in 1884
Discoveries by Guillaume Bigourdan